Orbicularis muscle may refer to

 Orbicularis oculi muscle, a muscle around the eye
 Orbicularis oris muscle, a muscle around the mouth